Michael Lathrop "Mike" Strang (June 17, 1929 – January 12, 2014) was an American politician who was a one-term U.S. Representative from Colorado.

Born in New Hope, Pennsylvania, Strang was the grandson of landscape painter William Langson Lathrop. His family moved to Colorado in 1932, where he was raised and homeschooled at their ranch near Golden. He served as a second lieutenant in the United States Army from 1950 to 1953. Strang graduated with an A.B. in history from Princeton University in 1956 after completing a senior thesis titled "Law, Politics and Religion: The Mercury View." He then did graduate work at the University of Geneva in Switzerland. He was a rancher and investment banker from 1957 to 1985.

Strang served in the Colorado House of Representatives from 1970 to 1974, where he notably introduced legislation to legalize and regulate the sale and consumption of marijuana. In 1984, he was elected as a Republican to the Ninety-ninth Congress, defeating W Mitchell. He was an unsuccessful candidate for reelection in 1986, losing to Ben Nighthorse Campbell. He resumed horse and cattle ranching and worked as a consultant on natural resources and taxes. He was a resident of Carbondale, Colorado until his death there on January 12, 2014.

References

Further reading

 

1929 births
2014 deaths
Republican Party members of the Colorado House of Representatives
United States Army officers
Military personnel from Colorado
Ranchers from Colorado
American investment bankers
Businesspeople from Colorado
People from Garfield County, Colorado
People from New Hope, Pennsylvania
Princeton University alumni
University of Geneva alumni
Republican Party members of the United States House of Representatives from Colorado
20th-century American politicians
20th-century American businesspeople
Military personnel from Pennsylvania